The Communist Party of Sweden is a Marxist–Leninist communist party in Sweden and continuation of Workers' Party – The Communists (APK).

History 
The Flamman group, an orthodox pro-Soviet section within Left Party – The Communists (Vänsterpartiet Kommunisterna), emerged as an internal fraction when C.-H. Hermansson took over as party leader and distanced the party from Moscow. The group was centered on the party newspaper Norrskensflamman ('The Flame of the Aurora Borealis'; usually just called Flamman), the regional party publication in Norrbotten County. The fraction worked as a parallel party centre, and relations between it and the party leadership soured.

At the party congress in 1975, when Hermansson stepped down as party leader, the Flamman group launched Rolf Hagel as its candidate for the party leadership. Hagel was defeated by Lars Werner with 162 votes against 74. In the same year the Flamman-sympathizers were expelled from Kommunistisk Ungdom (Communist Youth), the youth league of the party.

The group broke away in 1977, and formed Arbetarpartiet Kommunisterna ('Workers Party – the Communists', abbreviated APK). A founding congress took place in the Swedish Riksdag. A large number of foreign delegates attended the congress, indicating that APK had strong moral support from CPSU and the orthodox sector of the World Communist Movement. Two MPs (and party central committee members), Rolf Hagel and Alf Löwenborg, led the split. Hagel was elected party president. Norrskensflamman became the central party organ.

Entire VPK party units joined APK in many places, including Malmö, Gothenburg and Mälardalen. The foremost stronghold of the new party was Norrbotten County. In total, up to 25% of the entire VPK party membership (other sources claim between 10% and 15%) joined APK. To a large extent it was the trade union cadres of VPK who joined APK. Shortly thereafter, a large section of the KU district in Gävleborg County joined APK.

Sveriges Kommunistiska Ungdomsförbund ('Young Communist League of Sweden', abbreviated SKU) was created as the youth league of the party. A student wing, Marxistiska Studenter ('Marxist Students'), was founded although it never attained any importance.

APK failed to make any electoral breakthrough, and gradually the party declined. The fall of the Soviet Union had a very negative impact on the party; many members left, either to leave politics completely or to rejoin the Left Party. SKU broke away in 1990, and had a short-lived period as an independent communist youth organization.

In 1995, APK was declared financially bankrupt by state authorities, the first political party in Sweden to suffer that fate.

Directly after the bankruptcy of APK, the core around Hagel regrouped and reconstituted their party as Sveriges Kommunistiska Parti (Communist Party of Sweden). In 2000 SKU was reorganized as the party youth league.

Election results

Riksdag

European Parliament

The party was represented in a municipal council until 2013 when their representatives were expelled from the party.

See also 
 Communist Party of Sweden (disambiguation)

References

External links 
  Sveriges Kommunistiska Parti – Official site
 TVKommunist – Official YouTube channel
 Riktpunkt

1977 establishments in Sweden
Communist parties in Sweden
Far-left politics in Sweden
Political parties established in 1977
Minor political parties in Sweden
International Meeting of Communist and Workers Parties